Chandragiri Hill ( Nepali: चन्द्रागिरी ) is seven kilometres from Thankot, and lies on the south-west side of Kathmandu Valley which is 2551 metres above sea level. The hill provides panoramic views of Kathmandu Valley and the Himalayan ranges from Annapurna to Everest. Chandragiri hill has cable car system to reach up to the temple of BhaleshworMahadev. Chandragiri is the place from which Prithivi Narayan Shah decided to attack during the war between Ranas and Nepalese.

References

External links

Kathmandu District
Landforms of Nepal
Hills of Nepal